VVC (Variable Valve Control) is an automobile variable valve timing technology developed by Rover and applied to some high performance variants of the company's K Series 1800cc engine.

About 

In order to improve the optimisation of the valve timing for differing engine speeds and loads, the system is able to vary the timing and duration of the inlet valve opening. It achieves this by using a complex and finely machined mechanism to drive the inlet camshafts. This mechanism can accelerate and decelerate the rotational speed of the camshaft during different parts of its cycle. e.g. to produce longer opening duration, it slows the rotation during the valve open part of the cycle and speeds it up during the valve closed period.

The system has the advantage that it is continuously variable rather than switching in at a set speed. Its disadvantage is the complexity of the system and corresponding price. Other systems will achieve similar results with less cost and simpler design (electronic control).

For a more detailed description, see the sandsmuseum link below.

Applications

MG Rover cars 
MG F / MG TF
MG ZR
Rover 200 / 25

Non MG/Rover cars 
Lotus Elise
Caterham 7
Caterham 21
GTM Libra

See also
 Variable Valve Timing
 Rover K-Series engine

External links
 How the MGF VVC really works
 MG Rover Group
 Powertrain Ltd, manufacturer of the VVC engines
 Sandsmuseum

Engine technology
Variable valve timing
Rover Company